Hermann Springer (4 December 1908 in Zurich– 12 December 1978) was a Swiss footballer who played for Switzerland in the 1938 FIFA World Cup. He also played for FC Blue Stars Zürich and Grasshopper Club Zürich.

References

External links
FIFA profile

1908 births
1978 deaths
Swiss men's footballers
Switzerland international footballers
1938 FIFA World Cup players
Association football midfielders
Grasshopper Club Zürich players
Footballers from Zürich